Pisonia is a genus of flowering plants in the four o'clock flower family, Nyctaginaceae. It was named for Dutch physician and naturalist Willem Piso (1611–1678). Certain species in this genus are known as catchbirdtrees, birdcatcher trees or birdlime trees because they catch birds.  The sticky seeds are postulated to be an adaptation of some island species that ensures the dispersal of seeds between islands by attaching them to birds, and also allows the enriching of coralline sands.  (Should a fledgling fall to the ground, become entangled in the Pisonia sticky seeds, and be unable to free itself, then it will starve, and so enrich the soil within the tree's rootzone.) These island species include P. brunoniana of Australasia and Polynesia and P. umbellifera, which is widespread in the tropical Indo-Pacific region.

Species
Pisonia aculeata L. – pullback (pantropical)
Pisonia alba Span.
Pisonia albida (Heimerl) Britton ex Standl. – corcho bobo
Pisonia brunoniana Endl. – Australasian catchbirdtree (Australasia and Polynesia)
Pisonia capitata (S.Watson) Standl. – Mexican devil's-claws
Pisonia donnellsmithii Heimerl ex Standl. (El Salvador, Guatemala)
Pisonia ekmani Heimerl (Cuba)
Pisonia excelsa Blume
Pisonia floribunda Hook. f. pega pega (Galápagos Islands)
Pisonia floridana Britt. ex Small – Rock Key devil's-claws
Pisonia graciliscens (Heimerl) Stenmerik (French Polynesia)
Pisonia grandis R.Br. – grand devil's-claws (Indo-Pacific)
Pisonia horneae (named after Frances W. Horne, 1873–1967) (Puerto Rico, Northern Karst and the Sierra de Cayey)
Pisonia notundata Griseb. – smooth devil's-claws
Pisonia roqueae (named after Ana Roqué de Duprey, 1853–1933) (Puerto Rico, Central Mountain Range and the Luquillo Mountains)
Pisonia sechellarum F.Friedmann (Seychelles)
Pisonia siphonocarpa (Heimerl) Stenmerik (French Polynesia)
Pisonia subcordata Sw. – water mampoo	 
Pisonia umbellifera (J.R.Forst. & G.Forst.) Seem. – umbrella catchbirdtree (Indo-Pacific)
Pisonia wagneriana Fosberg – Kauai catchbirdtree, pāpala kēpau (island of Kauai in Hawaii)
Pisonia zapallo Griseb.

Formerly placed here
 Guapira discolor (Spreng.) Little (as P. discolor Spreng.)
 Rockia sandwicensis Heimerl (as P. sandwicensis )

Gallery

References